Coddia is a monotypic genus of flowering plants in the family Rubiaceae. The genus contains only one species, viz. Coddia rudis, which is native to Mozambique, Zimbabwe, South Africa (the Cape Provinces, KwaZulu-Natal and the Northern Provinces), and Eswatini.

References 

Gardenieae
Monotypic Rubiaceae genera
Flora of Mozambique
Flora of Zimbabwe
Flora of the Cape Provinces
Flora of KwaZulu-Natal
Flora of Swaziland
Flora of the Northern Provinces